= János Inokai =

Hungarian engineer and politician

János Inokai (1910-1978)

János Inokai (1910-1978) was a Hungarian engineer and politician. He was born in 1910. From 1954 to 1965 he worked at the Metallurgical Works in Dunaújváros as Chief Engineer for Investments. He became a Member of Parliament in 1963. In 1966 he was appointed Director at the Budapest Metallurgy and Machine Engineering Design Enterprise, a post he would hold until 1976. From 1967 onward he was the Secretary of the Parliament Planning and Budget Committee. In 1975 he became the Deputy Speaker of the Parliament of Hungary. Inokai died on April 10, 1978.
